Raja Ramesh is a 1977 Indian Telugu-language thriller film directed and co-written by V. Madhusudhana Rao. The film stars Akkineni Nageswara Rao and Vanisri. The music was composed by K. V. Mahadevan. It is a remake of the Bengali film Sanyasi Raja (1975), which was based on the Bhawal case. The film was released on 21 July 1977.

Plot 

Raja Rameshchandra Bhupathi is the ruler of a rich estate. He enjoys life by indulging in drinking and merrymaking. He is also a benevolent man. So, everyone in his estate revers him like a deity. His wife, Rani Indumathi Devi, feels ignored by him and she suffers from loneliness. Dr. Seshagiri is appointed as the royal doctor by raja Ramesh. The doctor is actually a greedy and vicious man who wishes to usurp the estate and also lusts after the beautiful rani. He starts to slowly poison the raja. One day, he sedates the rani and rapes her. When the raja falls ill from the poison, the doctor conspires to have him shifted to a lonely beach house. He subsequently finishes of the raja and by blackmailing the rani regarding her assault he manages to get the raja hastily cremated. However, due to heavy rains the raja's corpse gets swept away. He is found by a monk who discovers that the raja is actually alive, but has lost his memory. Meanwhile, the doctor has taken over the estate and commits many atrocities on the hapless people of the estate. He has kept the rani virtually imprisoned in the palace who has fallen silent due to the trauma of the situation. The monk guides the raja back to the estate. The people recognize him and are overjoyed to see him alive. The doctor wants to murder him when he regains his memory, but meanwhile the government appoints an enquiry commission to get to the bottom of the matter. The doctor tries to intimidate the rani into lying to the commission that the man claiming to be the raja is an imposter, but she is overwhelmed and speaks the truth instead. The doctor goes to shoot the raja, but the rani comes between them and is killed instead. The people of the estate are enraged by this and they mercilessly attack the doctor finishing him once and for all. After the rani's funeral, Raja Ramesh entrusts his property to the public and continues his journey as a monk for penance.

Cast 
Akkineni Nageswara Rao as Raja Ramesh Chandra Bhupathi
Vanisri as Rani Indumathi Devi
Jaggayya as Dr. Seshagiri
Sridhar as Lawyer
Mikkilineni as Vaikuntham
P. J. Sarma as Diwanji
Sarathi as Kaasi
K. V. Chalam
Balakrishna
P. L. Narayana as Thamos
Kanchana as Padmaja
Vijaya Lalitha as Vilasini
Jayamalini as item number
Halam as item number
Sasirekha as Ratnabala

Soundtrack 
The music was composed by K. V. Mahadevan. Lyrics were written by Acharya Aatreya.

References

External links 
 

1970s thriller films
Films directed by V. Madhusudhana Rao
Films scored by K. V. Mahadevan
Indian thriller films
Telugu remakes of Bengali films